NCAA Division I Indoor Track and Field Championships may refer to:

 NCAA Men's Division I Indoor Track and Field Championships
 NCAA Women's Division I Indoor Track and Field Championships